The Zeeland Bridge is the longest bridge in the Netherlands. The bridge spans the Eastern Scheldt estuary. It connects the islands of Schouwen-Duiveland and Noord-Beveland in the province of Zeeland.

The Zeeland Bridge was built between 1963 and 1965. It was inaugurated on 15 December 1965 by Queen Juliana of the Netherlands, and was originally called Eastern Scheldt Bridge before being renamed the Zealand Bridge on 13 April 1967. At the time of its completion, it was the longest bridge in Europe. It has a total length of 5,022 metres, and consists of 48 spans of 95 metres, 2 spans of 72.5 metres and a movable bridge with a width of 40 metres.

The province of Zeeland borrowed the money for the construction of the bridge. The loan was repaid by levying tolls for the first 24 years.

References

External links
 Zeelandbrug Youtube

Bascule bridges
Former toll bridges
Viaducts
Bridges completed in 1965
Concrete bridges in the Netherlands
Road bridges in the Netherlands
Bridges in Zeeland
Buildings and structures in Schouwen-Duiveland
Noord-Beveland
Zierikzee
1965 establishments in the Netherlands
20th-century architecture in the Netherlands